The College of Engineering and Physical Science (CEPS), is one of seven faculties – referred to as “colleges”  – at the University of Guelph in Ontario, Canada. CEPS operates on the University of Guelph main campus, one of four across Ontario, and has one of the largest faculty, staff, and student populations of the seven colleges at U of G.

CEPS offers four undergraduate degrees spanning 20 majors, and master’s and PhD graduate programs spanning disciplines in: Bioinformatics, Biophysics, Chemistry, Computational Sciences, Computer Science, Cybersecurity and Threat Intelligence, Engineering, Mathematics and Statistics, and Physics. The current dean is interim dean Gerarda Darlington.

History of the College
The University of Guelph traces its origins back to May 1, 1874, when the Province of Ontario purchased 200 hectares (500 acres) of farmland and opened the Ontario School of Agriculture, which later became Ontario Agricultural College (OAC). The Macdonald Institute and Ontario Veterinary College (OVC) were created in 1903 and 1922, respectively, and in 1964, the three bodies merged to form a single institution: the University of Guelph.

While CEPS did not exist in its current form at the time, its subject areas were taught across the University. For example, Engineering had been taught within OAC in various formats since its establishment in 1874. In 1957, the Department of Agricultural Engineering changed its name to the Department of Engineering Science. In 1965, the Senate of the University of Guelph established The School of Agricultural Engineering further adding the B.Sc. (Eng) degree. In 1969, Wellington College was divided into the College of Arts, the College of Physical Science, and the College of Social Science.

In 1989, OAC’s School of Engineering merged with the College of Physical Sciences to form the College of Physical and Engineering Sciences. In 2008, the University of Guelph launched Canada's first full-fledged Nanoscience major within CEPS. In 2017, the College’s name was changed to the “College of Engineering and Physical Sciences."

In late 2018, the University of Guelph established the Centre for Advancing Ethical and Responsible Artificial Intelligence (CARE-AI). One of just a few groups of its kind, the research and teaching centre aims to improve life through artificial intelligence and address ethics in AI.

College of Engineering and Physical Sciences Today
Today, the College is home to three departments and two schools. Its key priorities are grounded in research and education. Its strategic plan lists the College’s mission as “to become a national leader in student experience and impactful research by inspiring innovation in teaching and excellence in multidisciplinary partnerships.”

The plan lists six guiding principles:
 Leading in Learning.
 Enhancing Research and Discovery.
 Boosting our Profile.
 Creating a Strong Community.
 Fostering Diversity.
 Making Connections.

Departments and programs

Department of Chemistry 
The Department of Chemistry focuses its activities and education on chemistry theory and research, including analytical, inorganic, nanoscience, organic, theoretical, polymer, biological or biochemistry, physical chemistry, and more. Faculty members are located in the McNaughton Building and the Summerlee Science Complex.

Undergraduate programs  
 Chemistry Major B.Sc. (Co-op available)
 Biological and Pharmaceutical Chemistry B.Sc. (Co-op available)

Graduate programs  
 Chemistry M.Sc and PhD via partnership with the University of Waterloo Guelph-Waterloo Centre for Graduate Work in Chemistry and Biochemistry, which is highly recognized across Canada as one of the best chemistry graduate programs in the country.

School of Computer Science 
The School of Computer Science focuses its activities and education computer science theory and research, including software development, bioinformatics, data science, computer science, computational intelligence, cybersecurity, game programming, software engineering and design, human computer interaction, artificial intelligence, and more. The School is located in the Reynolds building,

Undergraduate programs 
 Bachelor of Computing General B.Comp
 Computer Science B.Comp (Co-op available)
 Software Engineering B.Comp (Co-op available)

Graduate programs 
 Computer Science M.Sc.
 Cybersecurity and Threat Intelligence MCTI (Course-based)
 Computational Sciences PhD

School of Engineering 
The School of Engineering focuses its activities and education on engineering programming and research including water and environment engineering, sustainable energy systems, instrumentation design, resource and waste management, intelligent systems and automation, food and bioprocess engineering, and more. The school is located in the Albert A. Thornborough Building.

Undergraduate programs 
 Biological Engineering B.Eng (Co-op available)
 Biomedical Engineering B.Eng (Co-op available)
 Computer Engineering B.Eng (Co-op available)
 Engineering Systems and Computing B.Eng (Co-op available)
 Environmental Engineering B.Eng (Co-op available)
 Mechanical Engineering B.Eng (Co-op available)
 Water Resources Engineering B.Eng (Co-op available)

Graduate programs 
 Engineering M.Eng. (Course-based), M.A.Sc., PhD

Department of Mathematics and Statistics
The Department of Mathematics and Statistics focuses its activities and education on mathematics theory and research including bioinformatics, artificial intelligence, modelling and simulation, imaging, dynamical systems, simulation models, game theory, quantum computing, climate change, networks, statistical learning, infectious disease, data science, biostatistics, and more. The department is located in the MacNaughton building.

Undergraduate programs 
 Mathematical Science B.Sc.
 Applied Statistics Diploma

Graduate programs 
 Mathematics M.Sc., PhD 
 Statistics M.Sc., PhD

Department of Physics
The Department of Physics is located in the MacNaughton building and focuses its activities and education on physics theory and research including applied, astrophysics and gravitation, atomic and molecular, biophysics, chemical, condensed matter and materials, nanoscience, subatomic, and planetary physics.

In addition, the department has its own observatory located on top of the building. Guelph faculty members collaborate with many off-campus research institutions including: CSA/NASA, the Perimeter Institute for Theoretical Physics, the Canadian Light Source, and TRIUMF as well as on campus collaborations with the Advanced Analysis Centre. Faculty member Ralf Gellert is a lead scientist for the Alpha particle X-ray spectrometer (APXS) that is on board the Mars Exploration Rovers (MER).

Undergraduate programs 
 Biological and Medical Physics B.Sc. (Co-op available)
 Physics B.Sc. (Co-op available)
 Theoretical Physics B.Sc.

Graduate programs 
 Physics M.Sc., PhD

Interdisciplinary Programs

Undergraduate programs 
 Biomedical Toxicology B.Sc. (Co-op available)
 Chemical Physics B.Sc. (Co-op available)
 Nanoscience B.Sc. (Co-op available)
 Physical Science B.Sc.

Graduate programs 
 Biophysics M.Sc., PhD 
 Collaborative Specialization in Artificial Intelligence M.Sc., M.A.Sc. 
 Collaborative Specialization in Toxicology M.Sc., PhD

Physical Science and Engineering Education Centre
The Physical Science and Engineering Education Centre (PSEER) was established in 2012 in the College of Physical and Engineering Sciences to support and promote learning and improve effectiveness of teaching within the Departments of Chemistry, Physics, and Mathematics & Statistics, and the Schools of Computer Science and Engineering.

PSEER supports education through cultivating knowledge of best teaching practice for faculty, funding to improve engineering and science education, events and lectures for faculty, and to foster quality education research, based on solid experimental design, execution and interpretation.

Culture

Outreach and Community Engagement
CEPS runs Creative Encounters with Science, a STEM Outreach program which began in 1993. The program runs a STEM summer day camp, in-school workshops, after-school clubs, and participates in various on-campus STEM events. As a network member of Actua, a non-profit organization made up of a Canadian network of 40 university and college-based members, Creative Encounters focuses on various initiatives such as Aboriginal Outreach, at-risk youth, and P.A.G.E.S. all-girls programming.

The Department of Physics has a long history of STEM Outreach. A travelling physics road show based at U of G has visited Ontario schools for more than 40 years. The department’s faculty, staff, and students create content for the Guelph Physics YouTube channel, which has educational series including “Ask Me Anything Science Edition”, “Tips and Tricks with Mel” as well as instructional videos. In 2014, U of G Physics majors became the first undergraduate physics program in Canada to require a science communication course, culminating in an annual STEM Week event.

Alongside the College of Biological Science and the Ontario Agricultural College, CEPS created the Guelph Science Olympics in 2009. Science Olympics is now campus-wide with over 25 team events, and more than 1200 competitors from 40 local high schools each year.

CEPS Prof. Valerie Davidson, as the NSERC Chair for Women in Science and Engineering, helped found the Ontario Network of Women in Engineering (ONWiE) in February 2005. It is a network of 24 schools of engineering from across Ontario, and throughout Canada. Its purpose is to encourage young girls across the country to pursue careers in engineering, as well as supports for current female engineers and students, including annual events like Go ENG Girl and Go CODE Girl.

At Guelph, Go ENG Girl, invites grade 5 to 8 girls to campus with their parents and learn more about engineering through a series of fun hands-on activities and exhibits. This event is organized by Women in Engineering and Science (WiSE) club.  

Go CODE Girl is an annual event organized by Guelph Women in Computer Science (GWiCS) to introduce grades 7-10 girls to career possibilities  in technology, computing and software engineering. 

In July 2023, the Department of Chemistry will be hosting ChemEd 2023, originally scheduled for 2021. ChemEd is the largest conference for high school chemistry teachers in North America. The biennial conference can draw from 400-900 chemistry teachers together to share their ideas. The conference has long history, starting in Canada in 1973 at the University of Waterloo.  In July 2021, Best of ChemEd, a 3-day virtual mini-conference, was hosted by the University of Guelph with the help of ChemEd 2025 (Colorado) and the American Association of Chemistry Teachers (AACT).  The free event engaged over 1,000 educators from 54 different countries and was a placeholder for the community to gather until they can resume the in-person conference.

Roboticon is an annual event run in partnership with the University of Guelph’s School of Computer Science and the Society of Computing and Information Science. Its purpose is for high school students to learn more about the field of Computer Science by designing and complete a series of challenges designed by CEPS undergraduate students. 

Supermath Day has been an annual event for teachers to bring their senior-level students to campus for a day of mathematics activities and to experience university life. The event began in 1982 and at its peak, SuperMath Day events drew thousands of high school students to campus each year. The event is now held the Tuesday after Thanksgiving.

There is a Let's Talk Science Outreach site at the University of Guelph. The Let’s Talk Science Outreach program is partnered with post-secondary institutions across Canada delivering interactive STEM activities in classrooms or at community events, in-person or virtually. One of U of G’s most popular Let’s Talk Science events, School of Witchcraft and Wizardry started in 2015 and is attended by over 2,000 guests on campus each November.

College of Engineering and Physical Sciences Student Council 
The CEPS Student Council (CEPSSC) is a student-run organization that brings CEPS students together for social activities and represents their interests to College leadership, alumni associations, and the general University community. The hub of CEPS is in the Summerlee Science Complex, where weekly meetings occur and offices of council members reside. These elected positions include a president, vice-president (internal affairs), vice-president (communication), vice-president (external affairs), vice-president (finance), and a vice-president (social affairs).

CEPSSC also supports registered academic interest groups within the college. Each club has the right to vote on CEPSSC issues during their weekly meetings.
 Bachelor of Arts and Science Student Association
 Chemistry & Biochemistry Club
 Guelph Engineering Society
 Math & Stats Club
 Nanoscience Club
 Physics and Astronomy Club
 Society of Computing & Information Science
 Toxicology Student Association
 Guelph Women in Computer Science

Notable alumni
See List of University of Guelph people.

See also
University of Guelph
Guelph, Ontario
List of Ontario Universities
University of Guelph Arboretum
University of Guelph-Humber
Guelph Gryphons
Central Student Association
The Ontarion

References

External links 
University of Guelph
City of Guelph
CEPS Website
CEPS Student Council Website

University of Guelph